Mariah Fredericks is the author of the Jane Prescott mystery series, set in 1910s New York. She was born and raised in New York City. She graduated from Vassar College with a degree in history and was the head copywriter for Book-of-the-Month Club for many years.

Bibliography

Novels

Jane Prescott Mysteries 

A Death of No Importance (2018)
Death of a New American (2019)
Death of An American Beauty (2020)
Death of a Showman (2022, ISBN 9781250830432)

In the Cards 

Love (2006)
Fame (2008)
Life (2008)

Standalone Novels 

Crunch Time, (2016)
Season of the Witch (2013)
The Girl in the Park (2012)
The True Meaning of Cleavage (2003)
Head Games (2004)
Fatal Distraction (published as Emmi Fredericks; 2004)
The Lindbergh Nanny (2022, ISBN 9781250827401)

Nonfiction 

 The Smart Girl's Guide to Tarot (published as Emmi Fredericks, 2004)

External links

Year of birth missing (living people)
21st-century American novelists
American women novelists
Living people
21st-century American women writers